Federal Dam is a city in Cass County, Minnesota, United States, near Leech Lake. The population was 110 at the 2010 census. It is part of the Brainerd Micropolitan Statistical Area.

History
A post office called Federal Dam was established in 1910. The city took its name from a nearby dam constructed by the federal government of the United States.

Geography
County Road 8 serves as a main route in the community.  County Roads 4 and 63 are both nearby. The Leech Lake River flows nearby.

Demographics

2010 census
As of the census of 2010, there were 110 people, 49 households, and 26 families living in the city. The racial makeup of the city was 56.4% White, 23.6% Native American, and 20.0% from two or more races.

There were 49 households, of which 28.6% had children under the age of 18 living with them, 36.7% were married couples living together, 6.1% had a female householder with no husband present, 10.2% had a male householder with no wife present, and 46.9% were non-families. 32.7% of all households were made up of individuals, and 12.3% had someone living alone who was 65 years of age or older. The average household size was 2.24 and the average family size was 2.92.

The median age in the city was 48 years. 23.6% of residents were under the age of 18; 8.2% were between the ages of 18 and 24; 13.6% were from 25 to 44; 38.2% were from 45 to 64; and 16.4% were 65 years of age or older. The gender makeup of the city was 50.0% male and 50.0% female.

2000 census
As of the census of 2000, there were 101 people, 43 households, and 23 families living in the city. The racial makeup of the city was 71.29% White, 18.81% Native American, 0.99% Asian, and 8.91% from two or more races.

There were 43 households, out of which 23.3% had children under the age of 18 living with them, 39.5% were married couples living together, 11.6% had a female householder with no husband present, and 44.2% were non-families. 41.9% of all households were made up of individuals, and 14.0% had someone living alone who was 65 years of age or older. The average household size was 2.35 and the average family size was 3.29.

In the city, the population was spread out, with 35.6% under the age of 18, 5.0% from 18 to 24, 18.8% from 25 to 44, 20.8% from 45 to 64, and 19.8% who were 65 years of age or older. The median age was 40 years. For every 100 females, there were 98.0 males. For every 100 females age 18 and over, there were 97.0 males.

The median income for a household in the city was $22,917, and the median income for a family was $27,188. Males had a median income of $11,250 versus $21,250 for females. The per capita income for the city was $12,414. There were 18.5% of families and 28.0% of the population living below the poverty line, including 45.7% of under eighteens and 17.2% of those over 64.

References

External links
Federal Dam Photo Gallery

Cities in Cass County, Minnesota
Cities in Minnesota
Brainerd, Minnesota micropolitan area
Leech Lake